Memucan Hunt (1729–1808) was an early American statesman and the first person to hold the position of North Carolina State Treasurer in its current form.

Biography

Early life
Memucan Hunt was born in 1729 in Virginia.

Career
He moved to Granville County (now Vance), where he became a planter. He owned nearly 16,000 acres (65 km2) of land, 22 slaves, two horses, four mares, 14 head of cattle and 33 hogs.

At the age of 41, in 1770, Hunt was chosen Sergeant-at-Arms of the Province of North Carolina House of Burgesses and in 1773 was elected as Representative to the Assembly from Granville County. When the spirit of independence began to rise in the colony, Hunt represented Granville County in the five Provincial Congresses. In 1777, with the War for Independence underway, the fiscal needs of the colony were among its greatest concerns. Hunt was appointed Treasurer of the Hillsborough district, one of six district treasurers in the State at that time. He continued to hold office in the North Carolina General Assembly and in 1779 was elected to the State Senate, serving as a member of the Committee of Accounts.

In November 1783, the General Assembly, in session at New Bern, abolished the district treasurer offices and established the singular fiscal position of State Treasurer and elected Hunt to fill the post. He took office on January 1, 1784, at a salary of 500 pounds per year. During his term in office, he unwittingly honored fraudulent claims for military service stemming from the Revolutionary War (paying too generously soldiers who had fought in the Revolutionary War, and in some cases, paying soldiers who had not fought at all), which resulted in both litigation and hearings by the General Assembly. While he was not charged with malfeasance, he was defeated for re-election in 1787 by John Haywood. Hunt retired from politics to Granville County, where he became a wealthy planter and served as justice of the peace until 1792.

Death
He died in 1808.

Legacy
His grandson, Memucan Hunt, Jr., was the namesake for Hunt County, Texas.

References

External links
NC Treasurer Official Site

1729 births
1808 deaths
People from Virginia
People from Vance County, North Carolina
State treasurers of North Carolina
American planters
American slave owners
American justices of the peace
Members of the North Carolina Provincial Congresses
18th-century American politicians